Frank A. "Red" Harris was a college football and baseball player and coach.

Auburn

Harris was a prominent football and baseball player. One account reads:"In the athletic history of Auburn, there never has been a single man who has ever exceeded the records that the famous "Red" Harris made there. He was for three years member of Auburn's varsity baseball team and captain of the same team during the past year. He was fullback on the varsity football team for the last three years, and has another year in which to play, but owing to the severe injuries sustained in the Carlisle–Auburn game of football at Atlanta last December in the post-season game, will be unable to finish his four years of football at Auburn."

Football
Harris was a fullback on Mike Donahue's Auburn Tigers of Auburn University. He weighed 148 pounds.

1913
Harris featured on the offense of the 1913 team which won the Southern Intercollegiate Athletic Association (SIAA) title. One writer summarizes this: "Coach Donahue loved the fullback dive and would run the play over and over again before sending the elusive Newell wide on a sweep." Harris was selected All-Southern. One writer claims "Auburn had a lot of great football teams, but there may not have been one greater than the 1913-1914 team."

Mobile
Harris then went to Mobile, Alabama to attend the University of Alabama school of medicine and took the job coaching football at Spring Hill College.

Head coaching record

References

Year of birth missing
Year of death missing
American football fullbacks
Auburn Tigers football players
Spring Hill Badgers football coaches
All-Southern college football players